The Pârâul de Câmp is a right tributary of the Râul Galben in Romania. It flows into the Râul Galben near Fărcădin.

References

Rivers of Romania
Rivers of Hunedoara County